Consonant gradation is the term used for a systematic set of alternations which are widespread in Finnish grammar. These alternations are a form of synchronic lenition. They occur also in other Finnic and Uralic languages; see consonant gradation for a more general overview.

Overview and gradation types
Consonant gradation involves an alternation in consonants between a strong grade in some forms of a word and a weak grade in others. The strong grade usually appears in the nominative singular of nominals and the first infinitive of verbs. However, there are phonologically predictable sets of nominals and verbs where nominatives and infinitives feature the weak grade, while other forms have the strong grade. Plosives that are preceded by any other obstruent, or followed by any consonant, do not display gradation. There are two types of gradation present in Finnish; these are detailed below.

Quantitative gradation 
The first type of gradation affects geminate (long) plosives  (orthographically ⟨pp, tt, kk⟩), these are lenited to non-geminate versions  in the weak grade. This type of gradation is called quantitative gradation due to the fact that the duration of a given plosive alternates between grades. 

For quantitative gradation, whether the strong or the weak grade appears is determined phonologically, for the most part. Generally speaking, if there are two syllables in a row, both of which would be closed if gradation did not apply, the consonant that constitutes the onset of the second syllable will be in the weak grade. (There are some apparent exceptions to this rule, discussed below.)

As an example, consider the alternation  :  ('bishop' : 'bishops'). The nominative singular  is syllabified into two syllables, but only the first is closed, thus gradation does not apply. By contrast, the stem  and nominative plural suffix  would form a word with two adjacent closed syllables (the ungrammatical * *, with the geminate  providing the onset of the second syllable), so the strong grade geminate  appears instead in the weak grade: . This alternation has been hypothesized to be a result of a pressure for syllable dissimilation.

Quantitative gradation is still productive, as can be seen from the gradation behavior of loanwords, and may even include new quantitative gradation patterns that are not native to Finnish:

Qualitative gradation 
The second type of gradation, termed qualitative gradation, involves an alternation between single plosives  in the strong grade and various voiced segments (or no segment at all: ∅) in the weak grade. In general, this type of gradation is not predictable phonologically, and is no longer productive. 

Qualitative gradation can feed gliding, making the link between strong and weak forms more opaque. These are derived first by  > ∅ qualitative gradation, with subsequent  >   gliding and resyllabification.

Some words, however, have truly exceptional qualitative gradation patterns that don't precisely fit into the general scheme explained above. In some words where  might be expected to become  in the weak form, it isn't present altogether, such as in  :  'towel(s)'. Alternatively it may remain unchanged, such as in  :  'resin(s)'.

In a subtype of qualitative gradation, the weak grade of a single plosive after a nasal or liquid becomes a copy of the preceding consonant. This is termed assimilative gradation, and can be understood as typical qualitative gradation followed by regressive assimilation.

Scope of gradation
Quantitative and qualitative gradation behave somewhat differently with regard to which words they can apply to. Quantitative gradation is still productive in Finnish, i.e. it is applied to loanwords that enter the language (e.g.  :  "rock music"). Personal names and neologisms are likewise affected by quantitative gradation; the personal name  has the genitive form  and the neologic nickname  (from the acronym PIK) has the genitive singular form .

By contrast, qualitative gradation applies only to words that were inherited from Proto-Finnic or the period shortly after it. It is no longer productive, in that it does not generally apply to loanwords (e.g. :  'automobile', compare native  :  'milk'), neologisms (e.g. the syllabic acronym  : , compare the common noun), or personal names ( : , compare the common noun). However, personal names may in fact be affected by qualitative gradation if derived from a known common noun (e.g.  :  from  'ray',  :  from  'chord'). Likewise, surnames often feature qualitative gradation, because many Finnish surnames are derived from common nouns, e.g.  :  from  :  'hill'.

Speakers may attempt to inflect native words without gradation or other associated morphophonological alternations, if they are previously unfamiliar with the gradational inflection: e.g.  'monolith' will be often have the unalternating genitive singular  rather than alternating  (compare native  :  'water', versus recent loanword  :  'vase').

The discussion below focuses on gradation as it appears in native vocabulary.

Inverse gradation

Grammars of Finnish may identify words that display "inverse gradation". To understand what this means, it's useful to note that a typical gradation pattern is one where the word stem ends in a vowel, and verbal infinitives and the nominative singular of nominals displays the strong grade, while the first person singular, present tense form of verbs and the genitive singular form of nominals displays the weak grade. An example of standard gradation in the nominal domain is  : , where the nominative singular  shows the strong grade. The nominative plural suffix  closes the final syllable, causing the weak grade to appear. 

The inverse pattern arises when the stem ends in a consonant. (This includes ''ghost consonants'', which are not marked orthographically and are only pronounced before other consonants.) With consonant-final words, it is the weak grade that appears in the infinitive and nominative singular, while the strong grade is found elsewhere. Consonant stems are thus said to have "inverse gradation" because the dictionary forms of the words exhibit a weak grade and gradate "backwards" (that is, get stronger moving from the nominative singular to the genitive singular, for example).

This state of affairs has a phonological explanation put forward by Paul Kiparsky. As mentioned above, gradation is tied to syllable structure: the strong grade appears when the consonant stands at the beginning of an open syllable (ending in a vowel), while the weak grade appears when the syllable is closed (ending in a consonant). In consonant stem nominals, the final consonant itself closes the preceding syllable, while in verbs, the combination of stem-final consonant plus the infinitive ending closes the preceding syllable; thus the weak grade appears for these forms. In the 1SG present and genitive singular, an extra  is inserted after the stem, which opens the syllable, hence creating a strong grade.

An example from the nominal domain is the inverse pattern  : , where superscript "x" represents the ghost consonant. This consonant closes the second syllable, causing a weak grade. However, when this stem is inflected, an epenthetic  is added. Since the ghost consonant is now syllabified as the onset of the third syllable, the second syllable is no longer closed, and the strong grade  appears. Ghost consonants are not pronounced between vowels, however, so resyllabification applies, yielding  as the final version of the stem to which affixes are added.

Multiple instances of gradation in a word

The weak grade of long consonants still triggers the weak grade on a preceding syllable, even though the consonant itself is not pronounced as long. The word  ("unknowing"), for example, features a weak grade  in the root, despite the fact that it is present in an open syllable. The reason for this state of affairs has to do with the privative suffix  that is present. Importantly, this underlying representation contains a long consonant , which closes the preceding syllable. This is what yields the weak grade - from strong grade  The final  of  doesn't manifest when this affix occurs word-finally, triggering word-final  >  (as Finnish words can only end in coronal consonants). This  now closes the final syllable of the word, triggering quantitative gradation on the affix itself. Subsequently, the conditions that motivated  :  gradation were made opaque by a subsequent application of consonant gradation (see counterbleeding).

Historical sound changes affecting gradation

The loss of certain sounds from Proto-Finnic has made the workings of consonant gradation less transparent. The result is that in modern Finnish, there may be phonetically open syllables preceded by weak grades (such as  'calf'), and closed syllables preceded by strong grades (such as  'calves').

Two sounds that were lost were word-final *-k and *-h. (Contemporary Finnish allows only coronal consonants word-finally.) Since *-k and *-h formerly closed the final syllable of a word, they triggered the weak grade. In modern Finnish, such words now appear as a weak grade consonant followed by a word-final vowel, but the word will have a special assimilative final consonant that causes gemination to the initial consonant of the next syllable. This assimilative final consonant, termed a ghost consonant  is a remnant of the former final *-k and *-h. Forms where this applies include:

 First infinitive,  (Proto-Finnic *-dak, *-t'ak). The  in the ending  is thus a weak grade, reflecting a former long consonant, which was formed by combining the verb's stem-final  (seen in the imperative ) with the normal infinitive . Verbs with this infinitive ending are thus actually consonant stems.
 Connegative forms of verbs (Proto-Finnic *-k).
 The second-person singular imperative (Proto-Finnic *-k).
These nominals look superficially like vowel stems, but the ghost consonant makes them consonant stems and they still inflect as such.

The loss of certain consonants in the middle of a word caused the two adjacent syllables to fall together into one. The former of these syllables was open, and so the syllable began with consonants in the strong grade. After they fell together, this continued to be the case, even when this new syllable was closed. Some examples of this include:

 Illative case, for example  →  (formerly ).
Verbs of this type are consonant stems; the lost *-d- is the weak grade of the former stem-final consonant *-t-.
As mentioned above, these are consonant stems and formerly had a final consonant *-k or *-h in the nominative.

An exception occurs in the present tense passive ending . This ending shows a weak grade, where the other passive endings have a strong grade, such as the past and conditional passive. The conditional ending is clearly segmented into three parts -tta-isi-in, where  is the conditional mood suffix. It could therefore be argued that the present tense simply lacks any infix at all. By this reasoning, the suffix is underlyingly *-tta-an, which consists of a long vowel with no lost consonant, so that the syllable is closed and the initial consonant is weakened.

References

Finnish language